Ali Daei (born 21 March 1969) is an Iranian football manager and former player. A striker, he was the captain of the Iranian national team between 2000 and 2006 and played in the German Bundesliga for Arminia Bielefeld, Bayern Munich and Hertha Berlin. He is regarded as one of the greatest Asian footballers of all time.

A tall forward, Daei was a prolific goalscorer and was known for his heading accuracy and ability in the air. He was the world's top international goalscorer with 109 goals, until his record was broken by Cristiano Ronaldo in 2021. During his playing career, Daei was appointed a UNICEF Goodwill Ambassador in 2001. Following his retirement, Daei served as a member of the FIFA Football Committee between 2007 and 2013. In 2014, he was inducted into the Asian Football Hall of Fame.

Club career

Early years

Daei was born in Ardabil, Imperial Iran to an Iranian Azerbaijani family.  Daei graduated from Sharif University of Technology in Materials Engineering (Metallurgical) with a BSc. degree. He began his playing career at 19 with hometown club Esteghlal Ardabil. His next club was Taxirani F.C. in Tehran, where he played for one season, before joining another Tehran-based club, Bank Tejarat. His tenure with Bank Tejarat lasted four years, scoring 49 goals in 75 games for the club.

Move to Europe
After his success with Bank Tejarat FC, in 1994 Daei joined one of Tehran's leading clubs, Persepolis. He went on to score 23 goals in 38 games for the club from 1994 to 1996. Following his impressive performance in the Asian Cup in 1996, he moved to Al Sadd for the 1996–1997 season, before joining Bundesliga side Arminia Bielefeld in 1997 alongside fellow Iranian national teammate Karim Bagheri.

Yet at Bayern he found himself low in the pecking order. This coupled with the Iranian national team's scheduling, Daei had found very little time for playing. Daei was unhappy with his position in the club and decided to make a move to Hertha BSC before the end of his three-year contract, when Bayern won the championship title in the 1999 Bundesliga.

Daei became the first Asian player ever to feature in a UEFA Champions League match. He scored his first and second goal in the UEFA Champions League on 21 September 1999 in a group stage match against Chelsea, won by Hertha 2–1. He also scored in a 1–1 draw against A.C. Milan at the San Siro. At Hertha he was a hugely important player, since he was only one of the squad's many successful players, who were to fulfill Hertha's Bundesliga and UEFA Champions League dreams.

Return to Asia

Daei was playing in numerous continental friendlies against world class opposition, yet was still unable to maintain a stable position in his club's starting line-up. In 2001, he was not among the top scorers in the Asian Qualifying round and he did not manage to take the team into the World Cup as captain for the first time. He joined the UAE league at 34 years of age, signing a contract with Al-Shabab as a free agent. In 2003, Daei quit the UAE team and joined his  team in Tehran, Persepolis. Daei moved from Persepolis to Saba Battery on a free transfer for a modest contract of around $300,000.

He spent two years at Saba battery, scoring 23 goals, winning the Hazfi Cup and participating in the Asian Champions League. After World Cup 2006 and the arrival of Saba Battery's new manager, Farhad Kazemi, it was announced that he was no longer needed on the team and his contract would not be renewed. Despite rumours of retirement, he signed for another industry-linked club from Tehran, Saipa, on 1 August 2006.

On 6 March 2007, Ali Daei was fined $2000 and suspended for four games by the Iranian Football Federation after the incidents in a league game where he delivered a head-butt to the face of Sheys Rezaei.

On 28 May 2007, after Saipa won the 2006–07 Persian Gulf Cup in a match vs Mes Kerman, Daei announced his retirement from playing club football and that he would concentrate on his coaching career.

International career

Daei was named the World's top scorer in official international competitions by the International Federation of Football History and Statistics (IFFHS), having scored 20 goals in competitive matches for Iran in 1996, including his famous four-goal haul against South Korea in Asian Cup 1996. By the end of the 1996 Asian Cup, he had scored 29 goals in 38 appearances for Iran. In the 1998 World Cup qualifying campaign, he was again on top of the charts, scoring nine goals in 17 matches for Iran, reaching at that time, 38 goals in 52 appearances for his country.

Daei joined the exclusive circle of players with a century of caps. In a 28 November 2003 Asian Cup qualifier in Tehran against Lebanon, he scored his 85th international goal, elevating him past the Hungarian Ferenc Puskás to top the all-time list of scorers in international matches. On 17 November 2004, he scored four goals against Laos in a World Cup qualifier, giving him 102 goals and making him the first male player to score 100 goals in international play. He has 149 caps for Iran and, as of 13 September 2019, is ranked 28th among the world's most capped players list.

Daei was called up to join Team Melli on 6 June 1993 in an ECO Cup tournament held in Tehran, where he made his debut for Iran against Pakistan. He continued his national team appearances and was named the top scorer of the final Asian round of 1994 FIFA World Cup qualifications with 4 goals in 5 matches.

On 17 November 2004, Daei became the first male footballer with 100 international goals when he scored four times against Laos in a 2006 FIFA World Cup qualifier.

Despite criticism, Daei played in the 2006 FIFA World Cup; the criticisms, however, were directed more at his fitness and the inability of younger players to play a part in the World Cup. From Iranian media calling for his retirement, Ali Daei has always defended his position in Team Melli and has rejected that he was too old to play for the team.

Daei ended his international career with 109 goals, an all-time record which stood until September 2021 when it was surpassed by Portuguese striker Cristiano Ronaldo. "I am honoured that this remarkable achievement will belong to Ronaldo," Daei wrote on Instagram.

College career 
Daei captained Islamic Azad University football team in 2007 World Interuniversity Games, scoring a hat-trick in the final match against University of Osijek and winning the gold medal.

Coaching 
In 2007 Summer Universiade, Daei was in charge as the head coach of the Iran students national team.

He was technical manager of the Islamic Azad University team in 2009 World Interuniversity Games.

Managerial career

Saipa

On 8 October 2006, upon sudden leave of Saipa's German coach Werner Lorant, he was appointed as the interim manager of Saipa. He was later officially announced as the full-time manager. On 28 May, Saipa became the Persian Gulf Cup champions in Daei's first season at the helm. Going into his second season as manager, Daei relinquished his playing duties for the defending champions and found himself on the sidelines full-time. The results of Saipa's 2007–2008 campaign were not nearly as successful as his team finished 11th in the 18 team Iran Pro League table. However, Daei did lead Saipa to an Asian Champions League quarterfinal birth before leaving to take over as the full-time manager of the Iranian national football team.

Iran national football team
On 2 March 2008, IRIFF officially appointed Ali Daei as Team Melli's new head coach. Despite admitting that his appointment as manager of the Iranian national team was a "surprise", Daei refused to leave his current coaching job at Saipa F.C., therefore taking on dual managerial careers until after Saipa had entered the Asian Champion League quarterfinals, after which Daei left Saipa by mutual consent. While Daei guided Iran to a respectable 16–6–3 mark, his third loss on 28 March 2009 to a Saudi Arabian team that was down 1–0 to Iran in Tehran proved to be the final straw.

During his tenure as the National Team coach, the Iranian team managed the weakest World Cup Qualification results in its history with only one win out of 5 WCQ games. After the loss in the 2010 World Cup Qualifier, Daei was fired as head coach after the match. While introducing many new players such as Gholamreza Rezaei, and Ehsan Hajsafi, Daei's squad was often in flux as to who would be invited to a fixture. As well, many critics pointed towards the failures of Daei's team to score and an unsolved weakness in the central defense as causes for his downfall.

Persepolis

In 2009, Daei turned down a job offer as manager of Rah Ahan. It was widely believed that Daei could be next in-line for the coaching position of Persepolis but the club chose Zlatko Kranjčar. On 28 December 2009, Daei was chosen as a coach of Persepolis. At the end of the 2009–10 Season, Persepolis finished fourth in the league but they became Hazfi Cup champions. In the Hazfi Cup final, Persepolis defeated Azadegan League side Gostaresh Foolad Tabriz 4–1 on aggregate to qualify for the 2011 AFC Champions League. In the 2010–11 season, Persepolis finished fourth in the league and was eliminated in the group stage of the 2011 AFC Champions League but at the end of the season Persepolis won the 2010–11 Hazfi Cup after defeating rivals Sepahan, Foolad and Malavan. Daei had many people against him while at Persepolis, including the chairman Habib Kashani and after a contention with Kashani, he stated that "I won't work with Kashani Anymore".

On 20 June 2011, Technical committee of Perspolis re-appointed Daei as Persepolis's head coach but he resigned on 21 June. The technical committee chose Hamid Estili as Daei's successor on that day. During his time at Persepolis, Daei brought up many youngsters such as Hamidreza Ali Asgari and Saman Aghazamani and other players such as Hadi Norouzi and Maziar Zare were chosen for Team Melli thanks to Daei. Despite the fact that many challenges and difficulties such as the leaders of fans and the clubs' Chairman Kashani were in Daei's way, Persepolis was crowned Hazfi Cup Champions for two successive years and the fans themselves always loved and cheered Daei, but at the same time they did not cheer for any player. Under the management of Daei, Persepolis won back to back trophies for the first time in 13 seasons.

Rah Ahan
On 14 July 2011, Daei signed a one-year contract as head coach of Rah Ahan. In his first match as head coach of Rah Ahan, he made a 2–2 draw with Zob Ahan. In his first season as Rah Ahan's head coach, he led the club to the 11th position.

During the 2012–13 season, Ali Daei used many young players such as Mojtaba Shiri and Omid Alishah, and Rah Ahan finished the season in the 8th place which was the clubs' best finish in the league since 1937. Thanks to Daei's popularity, more people started to watch Rah Ahan's matches, and for the second straight year, Daei was able to beat his former club Persepolis.

Despite many rumors that Daei will leave Rah Ahan for other clubs such as Persepolis or Tractor, he decided to stay with the club "to build a team that can qualify for the AFC Champions League." However, his contract was terminated on 20 May 2013, making ways for him to become head coach of Persepolis.

Return to Persepolis

On 20 May 2013, he signed a three-year contract to become head coach of Persepolis after a long negotiation. It was the second time that he signed with Persepolis, he returned to his former side after two seasons. He officially began his work with Persepolis on 1 June 2013. His first match came against Tractor, which Persepolis won 1–0 with the goal coming from Mehdi Seyed Salehi. At the end of his first year at Persepolis, his side finished runners-up, two points less than champions Foolad.

He was sacked on 10 September 2014 after a poor start of 2014–15 season.

Saba Qom 
On 1 July 2015, Daei became head coach of Saba Qom, signing a two-year contract. In two seasons with Saba he finished ninth and seventh in the Persian Gulf Pro League. He left Saba a few weeks before the start of the 2016–17 season due to uncertainty in the Saba's ownership situation.

Naft Tehran 
Daei became manager of Naft Tehran on 5 July 2016 with signing a two-year contract, replacing Alireza Mansourian. He led Naft to the Hazfi Cup title but left the club at the end of the season.

Return to Saipa 
Daei became manager of Saipa on 14 May 2017, a club that he started his coaching career in 2006 and led them to the league title in 2007. He led the club for two seasons and was sacked at the end of 2018–19 season.

2022 FIFA World Cup draw 

Daei was one of the Personnel involved for the 2022 FIFA World Cup draw held in Qatar on 1 April 2022.

Personal life

Relationships
Iranian journalist Camelia Entekhabifard wrote in her memoirs that she was marrying Daei in 1997, but the couple separated.

Business ventures and philanthropy
Daei owns his own football jersey manufacturing company called Daei Sport's Wears & Equipments, making sportswear for Iran sporting clubs in various fields and league clubs worldwide. His company also made jerseys for the national team. He has made very significant charitable donations and has made appearances in charity football matches worldwide (featuring in the World vs. Bosnia match with Roberto Baggio and others). He also appeared in a UNICEF commercial with David Beckham and Madeleine Albright, and has regularly been seen working with the organisation.

Daei featured on 18 July 2007 in 90 Minutes for Mandela, a match between the Africa XI and the Rest of World XI to celebrate the birthday of Nelson Mandela. Daei played approximately 10 minutes in the match which ended 3–3.

Religion
Daei is a follower of Shia islam. While he played for Bayern Munich, he refused to hold a glass of beer for an Erdinger advertisement because alcoholic beverages are forbidden in his religion.

Autobiography
In April 2008, Daei announced that he had begun writing an autobiography, due to be released in March 2010, and that despite reflecting on "bitter and sweet memories" he stated he would "keep some of his secrets in his heart forever". The book has not yet been released.

Accident
On 17 March 2012, Daei's car overturned as he was driving back to Tehran from Isfahan with his brother. Just prior to the accident, his team, Rah Ahan, had been beaten by Sepahan. Daei was then transferred to a hospital near Kashan. Rah Ahan's Media Officer, Hossein Ghadousi stated that "Daei is in a stable condition with regards to his vital signs and is not currently in any acute danger as a result of the accident". He was transferred to Laleh hospital in Tehran the following day.

A statement from the Asian Football Confederation (AFC) said: "The AFC wishes Iranian legend Ali Daei, who was involved in a car accident on Saturday, a speedy and full recovery. We stand ready to assist Daei, who is a true icon of Asian football. Our thoughts and prayers are with him." Sepp Blatter, President of FIFA, said on his personal Twitter page that he was shocked to hear Daei was injured. He also sent his best wishes for his recovery.

Street attack
In November 2020, Daei was attacked by two thieves while they were trying to steal his gold necklace in Tehran.
Police announced that the two thieves were arrested a few days after they attacked Daei.

Politics and activism
On 26 December 2022, Daei said that an international flight carrying his wife, Mona Farrokhazari, and daughter which was heading to Dubai was forced to return to Kish Island, due to his support for anti-government protests.

Career statistics

Club

International

Managerial statistics

Honours

Player
Persepolis
 Azadegan League: 1995–96

Bayern Munich
 Bundesliga: 1998–99
 DFB-Ligapokal: 1998
 UEFA Champions League runner-up: 1998–99

Saba Battery
 Hazfi Cup: 2004–05
 Iranian Super Cup: 2005

Saipa 
 Persian Gulf Cup: 2006–07

Iran U23
 Asian Games Gold Medal: 2002

Iran
 Asian Games Gold Medal: 1998
 AFC–OFC Challenge Cup: 2003
 WAFF Championship: 2004

Manager
Saipa
 Iran Pro League: 2006–07

Iran
 WAFF Championship: 2008

Persepolis
 Hazfi Cup: 2009–10, 2010–11

Naft Tehran
 Hazfi Cup: 2016–17

Individual
AFC Asian Cup Team of the Tournament: 1996
AFC Asian Cup top goalscorer: 1996
 AFC Asian Player of the Month: August 1997
 AFC Asian Footballer of the Year: 1999  
 IFFHS World's Top Goal Scorer: 2000 (20 goals)
 Order of Courage: 2005
 Asian Football Hall of Fame: 2014
 IFFHS Legends: 2016
 AFC Asian Cup Fans' All Time Best XI: 2018
 IFFHS MEN TEAM OF THE XXth CENTURY (1901–2000)
 Iranian Manager of the Year: 2006
 Nominated for FIFA World Player of the Year: 1997, 2001

See also

 List of men's footballers with 100 or more international caps
 List of top international men's football goal scorers by country
 List of men's footballers with 50 or more international goals
 Glyptothorax alidaeii

References

External links

 
 RSSSF archive of Ali Daei's century of international appearances and goals
 Profile at TeamMelli.com
 Autobiography
 Ali Daei News Magazine

1969 births
Living people
People from Ardabil
Iranian footballers
Iran international footballers
Association football forwards
Persepolis F.C. players
Al Sadd SC players
Arminia Bielefeld players
FC Bayern Munich footballers
Hertha BSC players
Al Shabab Al Arabi Club Dubai players
Saba players
Saipa F.C. players
Azadegan League players
Qatar Stars League players
Bundesliga players
UAE Pro League players
Persian Gulf Pro League players
Iranian football managers
Iran national football team managers
Persepolis F.C. managers
Saba Qom F.C. managers
Iranian businesspeople
FIFA Century Club
1996 AFC Asian Cup players
1998 FIFA World Cup players
2000 AFC Asian Cup players
2004 AFC Asian Cup players
2006 FIFA World Cup players
Sharif University of Technology alumni
Asian Games gold medalists for Iran
Asian Footballer of the Year winners
Islamic Azad University, Central Tehran Branch alumni
Asian Games medalists in football
Footballers at the 1994 Asian Games
Footballers at the 1998 Asian Games
Footballers at the 2002 Asian Games
Recipients of the Order of Courage (Iran)
Medalists at the 1998 Asian Games
Medalists at the 2002 Asian Games
UNICEF Goodwill Ambassadors
Iranian expatriate footballers
Expatriate footballers in Qatar
Expatriate footballers in Germany
Expatriate footballers in the United Arab Emirates
Iranian expatriate sportspeople in Qatar
Iranian expatriate sportspeople in Germany
Iranian expatriate sportspeople in the United Arab Emirates
Persian Gulf Pro League managers